Joakim Zander (born 1975 in Stockholm, Sweden) is a Swedish author and lawyer. His debut novel Simmaren (English title The Swimmer) was published by Wahlström & Widstrand in September 2013.

Biography 
Joakim Zander was raised in Söderköping, Sweden. He studied law at Uppsala University and later earned a PhD in Law from Maastricht University. His dissertation The Application of the Precautionary Principle in Practice was published by Cambridge University Press, and was awarded the Rabobank Prize in 2012. Joakim Zander has worked for the European Parliament and the European Commission in Brussels, Belgium. He currently lives in Lund, Sweden with his wife and two children.

Klara Walldéen series 
Zander's 2013 novel Simmaren (The Swimmer in English) is the first in his thriller series featuring the heroine Klara Waldéen. The book was followed by Orten (2015) and Vännen (2017).

Works

Nonfiction
The Application of the Precautionary Principle in Practice, Cambridge University Press, 2010

Fiction
Simmaren, 2013 (English translation: The Swimmer)
Orten, 2015 (English translation: The Brother)
Vännen, 2017 (English translation: The Friend)

References

External links
Joakim Zander, Ahlander Agency

Living people
1975 births
Writers from Stockholm
21st-century Swedish lawyers
Uppsala University alumni
Maastricht University alumni
Swedish thriller writers
People from Lund